Djibouti competed at the 2018 Summer Youth Olympics in Buenos Aires, Argentina from 6 October to 18 October 2018.

Competitors
Djibouti qualified 5 competitors for the games.

Athletics

Djibouti qualified 3 male athletes to compete in athletics at the games.

Boys

Judo

Djibouti qualified one female competitor for the games.

Individual

Team

Taekwondo

Djibouti qualified one female competitor in taekwondo.

References

2018 in Djiboutian sport
Nations at the 2018 Summer Youth Olympics
Djibouti at the Youth Olympics